Giovanni Conti (born 25 September 1960) is a Sammarinese windsurfer. He competed in the 1988 Summer Olympics.

References

External links
 
 
 

1960 births
Living people
Sammarinese windsurfers
Sammarinese male sailors (sport)
Olympic sailors of San Marino
Sailors at the 1988 Summer Olympics – Division II